Paranisopodus heterotarsus is a species of beetle in the family Cerambycidae. It was described by Monne and Martins in 1976.

References

Acanthocinini
Beetles described in 1976